Millennium Metaphors is the debut studio album by the Luton-based hip hop group Phi Life Cypher. It is notable for its highly political lyrics and has been likened to the early work of Public Enemy.

Critical reception
Tim Perry, in The Independent, wrote that the album got "across the current angst and disillusionment with Blair's Britain like no others" and that it was the "absolute flipside of the Lexus-and-diamonds rappers".

Track listing
"Intro" - 1:05
"ABC" - 5:25
"Rhyme of the Times" - 4:12
"BBC" - 3:50
"Racists" - 4:26
"Drop Bombs" - 2:59
"Take Heed" - 3:50
"Verbal Wars" - 4:13 
"Phi Life Phi Life" - 4:39
"Last Men Standing" - 3:35
"Fatcats" - 4:55
"Herbaholics" - 4:52
"Phi Life Is Here" - 3:38
"Tiks Sappan" - 1:21
"Bring It to Ya" - 4:35
"Bad Men From the West" - 4:43
"Class A Material" - 3:52
"Crazy Balheads" - 3:23
"Millennium Metaphors" - 4:21
"Shining" - 3:45

References

2000 debut albums
Phi Life Cypher albums